Kalabhai Raijibhai Dabhi is an Indian politician. He was elected to the Gujarat Legislative Assembly from Kapadvanj in the 2017 Gujarat Legislative Assembly election as a member of the Bharatiya Janata Party.

References

1958 births
Living people
Bharatiya Janata Party politicians from Gujarat
People from Kheda district
Gujarat MLAs 2017–2022